
Elisabeth Elliot (née Howard; December 21, 1926 – June 15, 2015) was a Christian author and speaker. Her first husband, Jim Elliot, was killed in 1956 while attempting to make missionary contact with the Auca people (now known as Huaorani; also rendered as Waorani or Waodani) of eastern Ecuador. She later spent two years as a missionary to the tribe members who killed her husband. Returning to the United States after many years in South America, she became widely known as the author of over twenty books and as a speaker.  Elliot toured the country, sharing her knowledge and experience, well into her seventies.

Biography
Elisabeth Elliot was born Elisabeth Howard in Brussels, Belgium on December 21, 1926; her family included her missionary parents, four brothers, and one sister. Elisabeth's brothers, Thomas Howard and David Howard, are also authors. 

Her family moved to the Germantown neighborhood of Philadelphia, Pennsylvania in the U.S. when she was a few months old. In addition to Philadelphia, she lived in Franconia, New Hampshire and Moorestown, New Jersey. She studied Classical Greek at Wheaton College, believing that it was the best tool to help her with the calling of ultimately translating the New Testament of the Bible into an unknown language. It was at Wheaton where she met Jim Elliot. Before their marriage, Elisabeth took a post-graduate year of specialized studies at Prairie Bible Institute in Alberta, Canada, where a campus prayer chapel was later named in her honor. Jim Elliot and Elisabeth Howard went individually to Ecuador to work with the Quichua (or Quechua) Indians; the two eventually married in 1953 in the city of Quito, Ecuador. In January 1956, her husband Jim was speared to death along with four of his missionary friends while attempting to contact the Huaorani tribe. Their daughter, Valerie (born February 27, 1955), was 10 months old when her father was killed.  Elisabeth continued her work with the Quechua for two more years.

Two Huaorani women living among the Quichua, including one named Dayuma, taught the Huao language to Mrs. Elliot and fellow missionary Rachel Saint.  When Dayuma returned to the Huaorani, she created an opening for contact by the missionaries. In October 1958, Mrs. Elliot went to live with the Huaorani with her three-year-old daughter Valerie and with Rachel Saint.

The Auca/Huaorani gave Elisabeth the tribal name Gikari, Huao for "Woodpecker." She later returned to the Quichua and worked with them until 1963, when she and Valerie returned to the US (Franconia, New Hampshire).

In 1969, Elisabeth married Addison Leitch, a professor of theology at Gordon-Conwell Theological Seminary in South Hamilton, Massachusetts. Leitch died in 1973. In the fall of 1974, she became an adjunct professor on the faculty of Gordon-Conwell Theological Seminary and for several years taught a popular course entitled "Christian Expression."  In 1977, she married Lars Gren, a hospital chaplain. The Grens later worked and traveled together.

In the mid-1970s, she served as one of the stylistic consultants for the committee of the New International Version of the Bible (NIV). She appears on the NIV's list of contributors.

In 1981, Mrs. Gren was appointed writer-in-residence at Gordon College in Wenham, Massachusetts.

From 1988 to 2001, Elisabeth could be heard on a daily radio program, Gateway to Joy, produced by the Good News Broadcasting Association of Lincoln, Nebraska. She almost always opened the program with the phrase, "'You are loved with an everlasting love,' – that's what the Bible says – 'and underneath are the everlasting arms.' This is your friend, Elisabeth Elliot..." Today re-runs of the program may be heard over the Bible Broadcasting Network.

In her later years, she and her third husband stopped traveling, but they continued to keep in touch with the public through email and their website.

Elisabeth Elliot died in Magnolia, Massachusetts on June 15, 2015 at the age of 88. Shortly after her death, Steve Saint, the son of Nate Saint who was killed alongside Elliot's first husband, posted on Facebook about her final victory over "the loss of her mind to dementia" and "her ten year battle with the disease which robbed her of her greatest gift." She was interred at Hamilton Cemetery in Hamilton, Massachusetts. She was survived by her third husband, Lars Gren, a daughter, Valerie Elliot Shepard and Valerie's husband Walter, and eight grandchildren.

Books 
 Shadow of the Almighty: The Life and Testament of Jim Elliot, 1958, 
 Through Gates of Splendor, 1957, 
 These Strange Ashes, 1975, 
 Quest for Love, 
 The Savage My Kinsman, 1961, 
 Furnace of the Lord: Reflections on the Redemption of The Holy City, 1969, 
 Twelve Baskets of Crumbs, 1977, 
 Let Me Be a Woman, 1977, 
 The Journals of Jim Elliot, 1978, 
 Passion and Purity: Learning to Bring Your Love Life Under God's Control, 1984, 
 Discipline: The Glad Surrender, 1982, 
 Love Has a Price Tag, 
 The Mark of a Man, 1981, 
 Keep a Quiet Heart, 
 A Chance to Die: The Life and Legacy of Amy Carmichael, 1987, 
 Path Through Suffering: Discovering the Relationship Between God's Mercy and Our Pain, 1990, 
 The Path of Loneliness: Finding Your Way Through the Wilderness to God, 2001, 
 No Graven Image, 1966, 
 Secure in the Everlasting Arms, 
 The Music of His Promises: Listening to God with Love, Trust, and Obedience, 
 The Shaping of a Christian Family, 1992,
 God's Guidance: A Slow and Certain Light, 1976, 
 Taking Flight: Wisdom for Your Journey, 
 Be Still My Soul, 
 Suffering Is Never For Nothing,

Portrayals of Elisabeth Elliot
In 1973, a readers theater production of Bridge of Blood: Jim Elliot Takes Christ to the Aucas was first performed at Tennessee Temple University.
In 2003, a musical based on the story of Jim and Elisabeth Elliot, entitled Love Above All, was staged at the Victoria Concert Hall in Singapore.  This musical was staged a second time, in 2007, at the University Cultural Centre, Singapore.
In the 2006 film End of the Spear, she was portrayed by actress Beth Bailey.
In Beyond the Gates of Splendor, a documentary film released in 2002, she appears as herself. (The other wives of the murdered missionaries, as well as several Indians, and others, also appear.)
In 2019, Canadian author Joan Thomas won the Governor General's Award for her book Five Wives which is a fictionalized account of the Elisabeth Elliot story.

References

External links 
 Elisabeth Elliot's home page.
 An Interview with Elisabeth Elliot on the website for the musical Love Above All – The Story of Jim and Elisabeth Elliot.
 web site of the documentary film, Beyond the Gates of Splendor, which includes an interview with Elisabeth Elliot.
 Elisabeth Elliot Papers, Billy Graham Center Archives, Wheaton College. 
 LIFE Magazine (Nov. 24, 1958)

1926 births
2015 deaths
20th-century American women writers
20th-century evangelicals
21st-century American women writers
21st-century evangelicals
American biographers
American evangelicals
American expatriates in Ecuador
Christian missionaries in Ecuador
Evangelical missionaries
Evangelical writers
Female Christian missionaries
Gordon–Conwell Theological Seminary faculty
Operation Auca
People from Franconia, New Hampshire
People from Moorestown, New Jersey
Wheaton College (Illinois) alumni
Writers from Philadelphia